Argentina XV, formerly known as the Jaguares, are the second national rugby union team in Argentina, after the full national side, the Pumas.

Overview
They already represented Argentina at the South American Rugby Championship, in 2001, 2002, 2005, 2009 and 2011. Argentina second side won all the South American competitions they have entered and never were defeated yet by another country in these tournaments.

They competed in the Nations Cup in 2006 and 2007, winning the tournament in 2006, and in the Churchill Cup in 2008 and 2009. They've played alongside the full national teams of Namibia, Romania, Georgia, the United States, and Canada as well as other second national teams like Italy A, the Emerging Springboks, and the England Saxons. They have also competed in a number of South American tournaments and will compete against North American teams in the Americas Rugby Championship. In 2014 they participated in the IRB Tbilisi Cup.

Results

 Churchill Cup

 2005: 2nd
 2008: 4th
 2009: 3rd

 Nations Cup / Tbilisi Cup

 2006: 1st
 2007: 2nd
 2010: 4th
 2011: 3rd
 2012: 2nd
 2013: 3rd
 2014: 1st
 2015: 2nd

 Americas Rugby Championship

 1st in 2009, 2010, 2012, 2013, 2014 and 2016.

 UruCup

 2015: 1st.

Current squad
Argentina XV squad to play tests against Portugal and Georgia on 30 May 2022 as part of the 2022 July international window.

Head coach:  Carlos Ignacio Fernández Lobbe

Note: Bold denotes internationally capped players.

See also
 Pampas XV
 Jaguares (Super Rugby)

References

External links
 

1965 establishments in Argentina
XV
Second national rugby union teams